Richard Lloyd "Rich" Duwelius (born November 23, 1954, in Benton, Kentucky) is a former volleyball player from the United States, who was a member of the American Men's National Team that won the gold medal at the 1984 Summer Olympics.

Background
Duwelius began playing volleyball at Ohio State University during the 1970s. After graduation from Ohio State, he started working out with the men's national team, whose training facility was in Ohio. He stayed through the 1984 Olympics, winning a gold medal. He retired from the national team after the Olympics and help coach at Mitchell College in New London, Connecticut and the Coast Guard Academy, which is in New London as well. Duwelius is now the head coach of the Ledyard High School girls' volleyball team, in Ledyard, Connecticut.

Summer Olympics
The competition was held in the Long Beach Arena, in California from July 29 to August 11, 1984. The United States won in three sets, 15–6, 15–6, 15–7. The medal winners were:
  - Gold
  - Silver
   - Bronze

U.S. men's roster
 Aldis Berzins
 Craig Buck
 Rich Duwelius
 Dusty Dvorak
 Karch Kiraly
 Chris Marlowe
 Pat Powers
 Steven Salmons
 Dave Saunders
 Paul Sunderland
 Steve Timmons
 Marc Waldie
 Head coach: Doug Beal
 Assistant coach: Bill Neville
 Assistant coach: Tony Crabb
 Team manager: Mark Miller

See also
 USA Volleyball

References

External links
 

1954 births
Living people
Volleyball players at the 1984 Summer Olympics
Olympic gold medalists for the United States in volleyball
Place of birth missing (living people)
American men's volleyball players
People from Benton, Kentucky
Medalists at the 1984 Summer Olympics
Ohio State Buckeyes men's volleyball players